Kucheng may refer to:

 Guzheng, a traditional Chinese musical instrument
 Gucheng (disambiguation), numerous places in China
 Gutian County, a county in Fujian, China